{{DISPLAYTITLE:C11H15NO2}}
The molecular formula C11H15NO2 (molar mass :  193.24 g/mol, exact mass : 193.110279) may refer to:

 1,3-Benzodioxolylbutanamine
 Butamben
 m-Cumenyl methylcarbamate
 3,4-Ethylidenedioxyamphetamine
 Isoprocarb
 Lobivine
 MDMA (3,4-MDMA, 3,4-Methylenedioxymethamphetamine)
 Methedrone
 1-Methylamino-1-(3,4-methylenedioxyphenyl)propane
 2,3-Methylenedioxymethamphetamine (2,3-MDMA)
 3,4-Methylenedioxyphentermine
 2-Methyl-MDA
 5-Methyl-MDA
 6-Methyl-MDA
 Tolibut